Generationals is an American indie pop duo formed in New Orleans, Louisiana. The duo, consisting of Ted Joyner and Grant Widmer, released their debut album, Con Law, in July 2009. An EP, Trust, followed in November 2010. Their second full-length album, Actor-Caster, was released on March 29, 2011. The band's third album, Heza, was released April 2, 2013 (their debut for Polyvinyl Records).

Biography
Ted Joyner and Grant Widmer were co-founders of The Eames Era, a Baton Rouge-based indie rock band whose song "Could Be Anything" was featured on the Grey's Anatomy soundtrack.  
The band broke up when three members decided they no longer wanted to pursue careers as musicians. The remaining members, Joyner and Widmer, formed a new band called the Generationals, so named because as they often watched CNN's coverage of the 2008 presidential election as they recorded, the pair noticed that nearly every issue was dubbed a generational issue.

Generationals released their debut album, Con Law, in July 2009 on the Park the Van label. Joyner and Widmer wrote the music and recorded the album with studio manager Dan Black. 
Mark Deming of Allmusic said the album's songs "are good enough to not suffer in comparison to the vintage acts they so clearly love, and that's why this debut is worthwhile, even if you're not nostalgic for the era of the sideways haircut." 
Andy Gensler of T: The New York Times Style Magazine called the album a "delectable debut" that "shimmers with the music of the British Invasion, Stax soul, Wall of Sound production, 1950s doo-wop and California-dreaming jangle filtered through a contemporary indie-rock lens." 
Spin's Jon Young said that although the duo's "cheery facade ultimately doesn't overcome the gnawing desperation, Con Law is good, neurotic fun." 
In a review of the band's song "When They Fight, They Fight," Zach Kelly of Pitchfork Media said of the band's style: "It comes as kind of a pleasant surprise to hear a band from N.O. sound this bright and enraptured in life's simple joys. But man, does this thing flirt with overdoing it."

"When They Fight, They Fight" was featured in a 2009 Bloomingdales holiday commercial. Another song, "Faces in the Dark," was featured on a season 3 episode of Chuck. "Exterior Street Day" was featured in a television commercial for Reese's Peanut Butter Cups at the end of 2010. 
Non-album track "Either Way" was featured as the opening credit song during the 2010 comedy film Going the Distance. The pair have completed several tours covering much of the U.S., and have opened for such bands as Broken Social Scene and Two Door Cinema Club.

Generationals released an extended play titled Trust in November 2010. The title track was featured as a "Pick of the Week" by Starbucks Coffee in January 2011. The track "When They Fight, They Fight" is featured in the Farrelly brothers movie Hall Pass in 2011 and also in a 2012 episode of Suits.

The song was used for an advert for the Amazon Kindle in 2012 in the UK and Germany.

The duo's second full-length album, Actor-Caster, was released in March 2011.

Members
 Ted Joyner – vocals, guitars
 Grant Widmer - vocals, guitars

Discography

Studio albums

Extended plays

References

External links

 
 
 Generationals at Park the Van

American musical duos
Indie rock musical groups from Louisiana
Rock music duos
Musical groups from New Orleans
Musical groups established in 2008